Matthew Kermit Miller is an American actor, stand-up comedian and playwright. He is also known as Kermit Miller and Kermit Beachwood. His best-known voice role in anime was Tenchi Masaki in the Pioneer dub of Tenchi Muyo. He reprised the role in the Funimation English dub of Ai Tenchi Muyo! in 2018.

Career
Miller has performed voice work in numerous film and television projects, but is better known as a stage actor and playwright who has performed with the Royal National Theatre of Great Britain, Sacramento Theatre Company, Sierra Repertory Theatre, and Foothill Theatre Company.  Miller became artistic director of the Sacramento Theatre Company in 2010.

Recognition
The Sacramento News & Review called Miller's portrayal of Ebenezer Scrooge in the Sacramento Theatre Company's December 2007 production of A Christmas Carol, "outstanding".

In 2009, he wrote and starred in the solo show Fits & Parts: My Life in Stages, a memoir on his own career as working actor and voiceover artist for Japanese anime. Of his performance, Sacramento News & Review wrote that Miller's "personable outlook, storytelling skills and good timing with jokes make a winning combination," with the Sacramento Bee called his performance both entertaining and engaging.  Also in 2009, Miller wrote Beat Aside Apollo's Arrow, for which he received a John Gassner Award.

Sacramento Bee made special note of Miller's debut as director of the Sacramento Theatre Company in their review of the theatre company's October 2010 presentation of The Importance of Being Earnest, writing "The importance of this 'Earnest' lies in its significance as director Matt K. Miller's debut as STC artistic director and as the company's season-opening production. Though Miller did not select the comedy or most of the STC 2010–11 season, he recognizes his good fortune in the playbill, noting 'Earnest' is as close to 'fool-proof' as a play gets".  They also made note of Miller having adapted the play slightly so that it moved briskly.

In praising the STC's November 2010 presentation of The Owl and the Pussycat, the Sacramento Bee wrote "the production is as good as it is as a tribute to Miller and his cast and crew."

In Miller's return to the character of Scrooge in December 2010, Sacramento Press writes, "It is the portrayal of Scrooge that makes the difference between a good and a great production of A Christmas Carol. Fortunately for STC, they have Matt K. Miller, an outstanding and very experienced Scrooge." The noted that Miller's transition from Scrooge the miser to the loving and generous Scrooge is very believable.

Awards and nominations
 2009: John Gassner Award for his play Beat Aside Apollo's Arrow.

Filmography

Anime dubbing
 Bio Hunter - Koshigaya
 Carried by the Wind: Tsukikage Ran - Fisherman (Ep. 7), Ukiya-Tei Henchman
 Castle in the Sky - Train Engineer, Additional Voices
 Cowboy Bebop - Additional Voices
 The Dog of Flanders - Mr. Ike
 Final Fantasy: Legend of the Crystals - Prettz
 Fushigi Yûgi - Additional Voices
 Gate Keepers - Creditor
 Giant Robo - Additional Voices (Animaze dub)
 Ghost in the Shell: Stand Alone Complex Dr. Miyashiro (Ep. 3)
 Kiki's Delivery Service - Policeman, Receptionist (Disney version)
 Mobile Suit Gundam - The Movie Trilogy - Mulligan
 Mobile Suit Gundam 0080: War in the Pocket - Andy Strauss
 Perfect Blue - Mima Fan
 Pet Shop of Horrors - Robin Hendrix
 Psycho Diver: Soul Siren - Funky
 Rurouni Kenshin - Sailor (Ep. 25), Shuji, Schneider
 Tenchi Muyo! series – Tenchi Masaki, others 
 Trigun - Chief (Ep. 19)
 Twilight of the Dark Master - Tenku
 Vampire Princess Miyu - Matchiyama (Ep. 1)

Animation
 Æon Flux - Ilbrid (Ep. 8)
 Gen¹³ - Additional Voices
 Spicy City - Additional Voices
 FernGully 2: The Magical Rescue - Batty Koda (voice) (1998) (replacing Robin Williams)
 101 Dalmatians II: Patch's London Adventure - Additional Voices (2003) (uncredited)

Video games
 Final Fantasy X/Final Fantasy X-2 - Clasko
 Medal of Honor: Allied Assault - Spearhead - Additional Voices

Live action
 Courthouse - Reporter #3 (1 episode, 1995)
 VR Troopers - Combax (1 episode, 1995)
 Mighty Morphin' Power Rangers - Garbage Mouth, Parrot Top (2 episodes, 1995)
 Masked Rider - Bananatex (1 episode, 1996)
 Off Centre - Executive #1 (1 episode, 2002)
 Gods and Generals - Brig. Gen. Charles Griffin (uncredited) (2003)
 Henry X - Emile (2003)
 Team Room (2008)

References

External links 

 Matt K. Miller at Voice Chasers 
Matt K. Miller at the CrystalAcids Anime Voice Actor Database

American male comedians
American male film actors
American male stage actors
American male television actors
American male video game actors
American male voice actors
Living people
People from Palm Beach County, Florida
Male actors from Florida
20th-century American male actors
21st-century American dramatists and playwrights
21st-century American male actors
20th-century American comedians
21st-century American comedians
Year of birth missing (living people)